The Dead Letter is a 1915 American silent comedy film starring Oliver Hardy.

Cast
 Oliver Hardy as Mateo (as Babe Hardy)
 Frances Ne Moyer as Lena Pula
 Vincente DePascale as Luigi
 C.W. Ritchie as Emelio (as Charles Ritchie)

See also
 List of American films of 1915
 Oliver Hardy filmography

External links

1915 films
American silent short films
American black-and-white films
1915 comedy films
1915 short films
Silent American comedy films
American comedy short films
1910s American films